Joep van den Ouweland (born 6 February 1984) is a Dutch footballer who plays for Derde Klasse club Gilze.

Honours
De Graafschap
 Eerste Divisie: 2009–10

References

External links
 Voetbal International profile 

1984 births
Living people
Dutch footballers
De Graafschap players
Go Ahead Eagles players
TOP Oss players
Eredivisie players
Eerste Divisie players
People from Gilze en Rijen
Association football midfielders
Achilles Veen players
Footballers from North Brabant